María del Carmen García Galisteo  (born 16 October 1930), in Seville, Spain, known professionally as Carmen Sevilla, is a retired Spanish actress, singer and dancer. She began her career in the 1940s and became one of the most popular and highest paid stars of Spanish cinema until the 1970s. In 1991, at the age of sixty, she began her career as a television presenter working for the three major Spanish networks until her retirement in 2010.

As an actress, she had leading roles in numerous films, including Imperial Violets (1952), Academy Award nominee Vengeance (1958), Don Juan (1956) and Searching for Monica (1962). She also had supporting roles in English-language epic films including King of Kings (1961) and Antony and Cleopatra (1972).

She began her career in 1942 as a dancer thanks to Estrellita Castro. In the 1950s she began to establish herself as a singer thanks to the songs she performed in her films. She released numerous albums, with many songs composed by her then husband Augusto Algueró, including coplas, boleros and tangos, and performed them on stage and television.

Career
Sevilla made her first leading role in 1948 in Jalisco Sings in Seville. Her rise to fame came with her starring role in The Troublemaker (1950) with Tony Leblanc. She then became one of the most popular and highest paid stars of Spanish cinema. In 1952 she starred Imperial Violets along Luis Mariano. She also played Mary Magdalene in the English-language Nicholas Ray's epic film King of Kings (1961).

On 3 January 1965 she made her first appearance on American television at The Ed Sullivan Show, where she performed live the songs "Mis noches de Madrid" and "Estando contigo", both composed by her then husband Augusto Algueró.

In 1972, she played Octavia in the English-language Charlton Heston's film Antony and Cleopatra, She also starred in No es bueno que el hombre esté solo (1973), Nadie oyó gritar (1973), and Beatriz (1976).

In 1991, at the age of sixty, she began her career as a television presenter working in different shows and specials for the three major Spanish networks until her retirement in 2010. She also presented the broadcast of the New Year's clock bell strikes live from Puerta del Sol in Madrid once on each of the three networks, being the only person to have done so on all three networks.

In January 2004, she received the 2003 Medal of Honour bestowed by the Círculo de Escritores Cinematográficos.

Personal life
In 2012, she was announced to be in a "very advanced stage" of Alzheimer's disease. In 2015 it was reported that she no longer recognized her home.

Selected filmography

Honours 
 Gold Medal of Merit in Labour (2001).
 Gold Medal of Merit in the Fine Arts (2003).
 Hija Predilecta of the Province of Seville (2007).

References

External links

1930 births
Living people
Spanish film actresses
Spanish television presenters
People from Seville
People with Alzheimer's disease
Spanish women television presenters
20th-century Spanish actresses
20th-century Spanish singers
20th-century Spanish women singers
Actresses from Andalusia